Pakaru Icefalls is an icefalls between Cape Evans and Turks Head on the southwest shore of Ross Island, along the Ross Sea. The feature comprises a very irregular and broken glacial area to the north of Turks Head Ridge with ice descending to Erebus Bay. It is descriptively named, Pakaru being a Māori word meaning "broken."

References 

 Pakaru Icefalls on geographic.org 

Icefalls of Antarctica
Landforms of Ross Island